Jalan Bakun or Jalan Bintulu-Bakun, Federal Route 803, is a federal road in Bintulu and Kapit Division, Sarawak, Malaysia. It is a main route to Bakun Hydroelectric Dam.

At most sections, the Federal Route 803 was built under the JKR R5 road standard, allowing maximum speed limit of up to 90 km/h.

List of junctions and town

Pan Borneo Highway project 
As a part of the Pan Borneo Highway project (WPC 10; Bintulu Airport Junction to Sg. Tangap), Jalan Bakun will have new four lane two way carriageway and an interchange at its junction. It was taken by Lebuhraya Borneo Utara (LBU) Sdn Bhd as turnkey contractor and the main contractor of the project is Pekerjaan Piasau Konkerit Sdn Bhd (PPK).

References

Malaysian Federal Roads